In mathematics, especially general topology and analysis, an exhaustion by compact sets of a topological space  is a nested sequence of compact subsets  of  (i.e. ), such that  is contained in the interior of , i.e.   for each  and .  A space admitting an exhaustion by compact sets is called exhaustible by compact sets.

For example, consider  and the sequence of closed balls 

Properties 

The following are equivalent for a topological space :

  is exhaustible by compact sets.
  is σ-compact and weakly locally compact.
  is Lindelöf and weakly locally compact.
(where weakly locally compact means locally compact in the weak sense that each point has a compact neighborhood).

The hemicompact property is intermediate between exhaustible by compact sets and σ-compact.  Every space exhaustible by compact sets is hemicompact and every hemicompact space is σ-compact, but the reverse implications do not hold.  For example, the Arens-Fort space and the Appert space are hemicompact, but not exhaustible by compact sets (because not weakly locally compact), and the set  of rational numbers with the usual topology is σ-compact, but not hemicompact.

Every regular space exhaustible by compact sets is paracompact.

Notes

References

 Leon Ehrenpreis, Theory of Distributions for Locally Compact Spaces, American Mathematical Society, 1982. .
 Hans Grauert and Reinhold Remmert, Theory of Stein Spaces, Springer Verlag  (Classics in Mathematics), 2004. .

External links

 
 

Compactness (mathematics)
Mathematical analysis
General topology